The Orgburo, also known as the Organisational Bureau, of the Central Committee of the Communist Party of the Soviet Union existed from 1919 to 1952, when it was abolished at the 19th Congress of the Communist Party and its functions were transferred to the enlarged Secretariat.

Role 
The Orgburo was established during Lenin's reign to make important decisions about organisational work in the Soviet Union. It oversaw the work of local Party committees and had the power to select and place Communist Party members in positions as it saw fit. The functions of the Orgburo and the Politburo were often interconnected, but the latter was ultimately the final decision-maker. While the Politburo mostly focused on strategic planning and monitoring of the people and status of the country, the Orgburo was tasked with overseeing the Party cadre and its assignment to various positions and duties, presumably in furtherance of the Party's strategic agenda.

Election and chronology 
In the same manner as the Politburo and the Secretariat, the Orgburo was elected at plenary sessions of the Central Committee. One of the Central Committee secretaries supervised the work of the Orgburo. The first Orgburo of three members (Vladimirsky, Krestinsky and Sverdlov) was elected on 16 January 1919, at the Central Committee meeting.
The 8th Party Congress (8 March 1919 – 23 March 1919) amended the party charter and set up provisions for election of the Politburo, the Orgburo and the Secretariat. The Central Committee plenum elected the new Orgburo of five members and of one candidate member on 25 March 1919. Some key Communist politicians (such as Joseph Stalin, Vyacheslav Molotov, Lazar Kaganovich and others) served as members both of the Orgburo and of the Politburo, but most of the Orgburo members were less important figures than those elected to the Politburo and the Secretariat.

See also 
 Bibliography of the Russian Revolution and Civil War
 Bibliography of Stalinism and the Soviet Union
 Comintern
 Uchraspred
 Organization Department of the Chinese Communist Party 
 Central Organization Commission of the Communist Party of Vietnam

References 

Human resource management
Bodies of the Communist Party of the Soviet Union
1919 establishments in Russia
1952 disestablishments in the Soviet Union